Myripristis kuntee is a species of fish in the family Holocentridae It is found over a wide area the Indo-Pacific and is common in some places.

References

External links
 
 
 

kuntee
Fish described in 1831